Andon is both a masculine given name and surname; a variant of Anton, found in Albania, Bulgaria and North Macedonia. It is also found as a surname. Notable people with this name include the following:

Given name
Andon Amaraich (1932–2010), Micronesian public servant, politician, diplomat and judge
Andon Beça (1879–1977), Albanian politician
Andon Boshkovski (born 1974), Macedonian handball coach
Andon Zako Çajupi (1866–1930), Albanian nationalist activist, poet and playwright 
Andon Dimitrov  (1867–1933), Bulgarian revolutionary
Andon Dončevski (born 1935), Yugoslav-Macedonian football player and coach 
Andon Gushterov (born 1990), Bulgarian footballer
Andon Kalchev (1910–1948), Bulgarian scientist, army officer and nationalist
Andon Kyoseto (1855–1953), Bulgarian revolutionary and nationalist
Andon Nikolov (born 1951), Bulgarian weightlifter
Andon Petrov (born 1955), Bulgarian former cyclist
Andon Qesari (born 1942), Albanian actor and film director

Surname
Joe Andon, Australian businessperson
Laura Andon, Australian model

See also

References

Albanian masculine given names
Bulgarian masculine given names
Macedonian masculine given names